The Scarecrow and his Servant is a children's novel by Philip Pullman, first published in 2004. It tells the story of a scarecrow who comes alive after being struck by lightning and sets out on a quest with Jack, an orphan he hires as his servant. As he goes on his quest he tries to reach Spring Valley to claim it for his own. He has many troubles along the way such as a bird who ate his brain and being on a deserted island.

It won the Nestlé Smarties Book Prize Silver Award in 2005, as well as being shortlisted for the 2004 Carnegie Medal. According to the author's website, the book is being adapted by BAFTA winning writer Danny Brocklehurst and turned into a film by Aardman.

References

2004 British novels
2004 children's books
British fantasy novels
Children's fantasy novels
Doubleday (publisher) books
Fictional duos
Novels about orphans
Novels by Philip Pullman